Clem Guy Bevans (October 16, 1880 – August 11, 1963) was an American character actor best remembered for playing eccentric, grumpy old men.

Early life
Bevans was born in Cozzadale, Ohio.

Career
Bevans had a very long career, starting in vaudeville in 1900 in an act with Grace Emmett. He progressed to burlesque, Broadway, and even light opera, before making his film debut at the age of 55 in Way Down East (1935). His portrayal was so good, he became stereotyped and played mostly likable old codgers for the rest of his life. Bevans played the neighbour of Gregory Peck in The Yearling and the gatekeeper in Harvey (1950). However, he did occasionally play against type, for example as a Nazi spy in Alfred Hitchcock's  Saboteur (1942). He also made some television appearances, including the role of Captain Hugo in the 1958 Perry Mason episode "The Case of the Demure Defendant" and as Pete in The Twilight Zone episode "Hocus-Pocus and Frisby" (1962). He played Captain Cobb in Disney's TV miniseries Davy Crockett.

Death
On August 11, 1963, Bevans died at the Motion Picture & Television Country House and Hospital in Woodland Hills, California. His remains are interred at Valhalla Memorial Park Cemetery in North Hollywood.

Selected filmography

References

External links

1880 births
1963 deaths
American male film actors
20th-century American male actors
Burials at Valhalla Memorial Park Cemetery
People from Cozaddale, Ohio
Male actors from Ohio
Vaudeville performers